Munson is a surname. Notable people with the surname include:

 Alex R. Munson (born 1941), Chief Judge of the District Court for the Northern Mariana Islands
 Art Munson (born 1940), American musician
 Audrey Munson (1891–1996), American artist's model and film actress
 Chuck Munson, anarchist, blogger
 Dave Munson (born 1942), American politician
 Donald F. Munson (born 1937), Maryland State Senator
 Edward Lyman Munson, brigadier general (US Army), Professor of Preventive Medicine
 Eric Munson (born 1977), American Major League Baseball catcher
 Gorham Munson (1896–1969), American literary critic
 Jim Munson (born 1946), Canadian Senator and journalist
 John Munson (born 1966), American musician
 John P. Munson (1860–1928), American zoologist
 Kevin Munson (born 1989), American Major League Baseball pitcher
 Larry Munson (1922–2011), American sports announcer and talk-show host
 Loveland Munson (1843–1921), Chief Justice of the Vermont Supreme Court
 Lyman E. Munson (1822–1908), Associate Justice of the Montana Supreme Court
 Ona Munson (1903–1955), American film and stage actress
 Scott Munson (born 1970), Canadian international soccer player
 Thomas Volney Munson (1843–1913), American horticulturalist and viticulturist
 Thurman Munson (1947–1979), American Major League Baseball catcher

Fictional characters:
 Eddie Munson, character in the Netflix Series Stranger Things
 Roy Munson, character in the film Kingpin
 Hal Munson, from the soap opera As the World Turns
 Old Lady Munson and Fiona Munson, female characters in the animated series Kid vs. Kat

See also
Monson (surname)